Kevin Ray Dogins (born December 7, 1972) is a former professional American football guard in the National Football League for the Tampa Bay Buccaneers and Chicago Bears. He also was a member of the Tampa Bay Storm in the Arena Football League. He played college football at Texas A&M-Kingsville.

Early years
Dogins attended Rice High School in Eagle Lake, Texas, where he received All-district, All-conference, All-Greater Houston and All-American honors as a senior.

He accepted a football scholarship from Division II Texas A&M-Kingsville, where his position coach was future NFL coach Juan Castillo. He became a starter at center as a freshman. In his last 2 years, he was part of an offensive line that included  Jermane Mayberry and Jorge Diaz. He earned All-American and All-conference honors as a senior.

In 2008, he was inducted into the Javelina Hall of Fame.

Professional career
Dogins was signed as an undrafted free agent by the Dallas Cowboys after the 1996 NFL Draft. He was waived on August 19.

On August 27, 1996, he was signed as a free agent by the Tampa Bay Buccaneers. He spent 4 seasons as a backup at guard and center. In 1998, he started 4 out of 6 games at guard. In 1999, he passed Jorge Diaz on the depth chart and started 5 games at left guard.

On June 22, 2001, he was signed as a free agent by the Chicago Bears. In 2002, he started 8 games at multiple positions along the offensive line. He wasn't re-signed after the season.

On April 10, 2003, he was signed as a free agent by the Atlanta Falcons. He was released on August 30.

On October 27, 2003, he was signed as a free agent by the Philadelphia Eagles, to provide depth after guard Jermane Mayberry was placed on the injured reserve list. He was declared inactive in 3 games and was released on December 20.

On January 25, 2006, he signed with the Tampa Bay Storm of the Arena Football League. He was placed on the injured reserve list on January 27. He was activated on March 25. He was waived on May 11.

Personal life
After football he worked as a real estate agent in Tampa Bay, Florida.

References

External links
Javelinas' Hall of Fame bio

1972 births
Living people
People from Eagle Lake, Texas
Players of American football from Texas
American football offensive guards
American football centers
Texas A&M–Kingsville Javelinas football players
Tampa Bay Buccaneers players
Chicago Bears players
Philadelphia Eagles players
Tampa Bay Storm players